is the name of several mountains in Japan. An incomplete list of the mountains is included below.
 Mount Byōbu (Gifu), in Gifu Prefecture - see Ryōhaku Mountains
 Mount Byōbu (Okinawa), in Senkaku Islands, Okinawa Prefecture